Francis Boateng (born 11 March 2000) is a Ghanaian footballer who currently plays as a defender for Ghana Premier League side WAFA.

Club career 
Boateng his professional career with West African Football Academy in January 2017He made his debut on 25 June 2017 after coming on in the 70th minute for Ibrahim Abukari in a goalless draw against Bolga All Stars. He played 4 league matches in his debut season as the club placed 2nd on the league table, their highest since entering the Ghana Premier League. In his second season, the 2018 season he played a more important role by playing 11 out of 15 league matches played as the league was cancelled due controversies surrounding the GFA due to the Anas Number 12 Expose. At the end of the season, he joined Portuguese team F.C. Famalicão and was drafted into their youth side and subsequently to the U23 side between July 2018 to June 2020.

Upon the expiration of his deal with Famalicão, he rejoined WAFA in November 2020. On 25 May 2021, he provided an assist to Enock Asubonteng after making a deep run from defence and sending in a cross which was tapped in by Asubonteng to help WAFA to a 2–1 victory over Ebusua Dwarfs.

International career 
Boateng was invited as part of the 26 players of the first batch of the Ghana under-17 squad camping ahead of the 2017 FIFA U-17 World Cup.

References

External links 

 

Living people
2000 births
Association football defenders
Ghanaian footballers
West African Football Academy players
F.C. Famalicão players
Ghanaian expatriate footballers
Ghanaian expatriate sportspeople in Portugal
Expatriate footballers in Portugal
Ghana Premier League players